"All Dat" is a song by American rappers Moneybagg Yo and Megan Thee Stallion. It was released on October 10, 2019, as the lead single from the former's third studio album, Time Served (2020). It is his first single as a lead artist to chart on the US Billboard Hot 100, peaking at number 70.

Music video 
A video for the song was released on October 10, 2019. It shows Moneybagg and Megan getting "close" and "comfortable" on the compound of their seaside mansion that overlooks a beautiful ocean.

Charts

Certifications

References 

2019 singles
2019 songs
Moneybagg Yo songs
Megan Thee Stallion songs
Interscope Records singles
Songs written by Megan Thee Stallion